This is a list of peaks on the Alberta–British Columbia border, being the spine of the Continental Divide from the Canada–United States border to the 120th meridian, which is where the boundary departs the Continental Divide and goes due north to the 60th parallel.  Peaks are listed from north to south and include the four peaks not on the Continental Divide but which are on the 120th Meridian, stretching approximately  due north from Intersection Mountain, which as its name implies is located at the intersection of the Divide and the Meridian.

See also
List of Boundary Peaks of the Alaska-British Columbia/Yukon border
Extreme points of British Columbia

References

 
 
 
 
Peaks
Peaks